Stephen 'Steve' Heffernan (born 1952) is an English former professional track cyclist.

Cycling career
He represented England and won a gold medal in the 10 mile scratch race, at the 1974 British Commonwealth Games in Christchurch, New Zealand and also competed in the time trial.

He was the winner of seven National Championships.

References

1952 births
English male cyclists
Commonwealth Games medallists in cycling
Commonwealth Games gold medallists for England
Cyclists at the 1974 British Commonwealth Games
Living people
Medallists at the 1974 British Commonwealth Games